The Yakovlev Yak-46 was a proposed aircraft design based on the Yak-42 with two contra-rotating propellers on the propfan located at the rear. The specification of the Samara turbofans was in the 11,000 kg (24,250 lb) thrust range. Though proposed in the 1990s, production of the Yak-46 never commenced.

Design and development
At the 1987 Paris Air Show, the Soviet Union displayed scale models of several aircraft in development, including a 150-seat aircraft powered by two pusher propfans mounted on the rear fuselage. This aircraft was unnamed at the time, but the Soviets disclosed that the Yakovlev Design Bureau was developing the aircraft. Later in 1987, the Soviet civil aviation minister noted that Yakovlev was building a twin-propfan airliner based on its Yak-42 model. In 1989, Yakovlev planned to test the D-236 propfan engine from the Ivchenko-Progress engine design bureau (also known as Progress, Lotarev, Muravchenko, ZMKB, and Zaporozhye) in flight on a Yak-42 testbed aircraft by the end of the year.

Yakovlev revealed details in early 1990 about Yakovlev's propfan design, which was given the name of Yak-46 and planned to enter service in 1997. However, the Yak-46 would have two unshrouded propfan engines mounted on the aft fuselage, instead of the Yak-42 and Yak-42M's three aft-mounted turbofan engines (that includes one attached to the vertical stabilizer). Yakovlev also proposed an unnamed interim derivative situated between the Yak-42M and the Yak-46, which would be powered by two underwing engines based on the contra-rotating, integrated, shrouded propfan (CRISP) engine concept. Since this derivative required greater airframe changes, Yakovlev was less sure of its eventual production.

At the time, airline interest but no orders were reported for the Yak-46, but Yakovlev was negotiating to sell 200 Yak-42M planes to Aeroflot, which was then the world's largest airline.

By October 1990, the two versions of the Yak-46 were in competition with the 102-126 seat Tupolev Tu-334, which like the higher-capacity Yak-46 had an interim turbofan version and a final propfan version, to replace hundreds of aging Tu-134 airliners at Aeroflot. To prepare for Yak-46 development, Yakovlev created a joint venture with Ivchenko Progress and the Soviet Ministry of Civil Aviation. Aeroflot would help fund a prototype, which would be built starting early in 1991 if the Yak-46 were selected. Annual production would eventually be as high as 100 airliners and would run through 2005.

On March 15, 1991, Yakovlev finally began flight tests of one D-236 propfan engine on a Yak-42E-LL aircraft testbed, making it the first propfan flight test program led by an individual Soviet aircraft design bureau. The testbed appeared on static display at the 1991 Paris Air Show in June. Like the D-27 engine, the D-236 was a contra-rotating system with an eight-bladed front propeller and a six-bladed back propeller. The testbed engine was limited to a smaller thrust, though, because the D-236 was more powerful than the Lotarev D-36 engine that it replaced.

In August, a report stated that the initial version of the Yak-46, now named the Yak-46-1, would have two Progress underwing power plants resembling the International Aero Engines (IAE) SuperFan engine, while the follow-up version, called the Yak-46-2, would again be aft fuselage-mounted D-27 engines. A Soviet aviation publication named the initial engine as the Progress D-627, a quiet, super-high bypass ratio turbofan. Derived from the D-27, the D-627 had ducted, contra-rotating fans and used a differential gearbox. The subsequent version of the Yak-46 would have the same characteristics and performance outlined for the D-27 earlier, but its cruise TSFC after losses would be  at  speed. In addition, the Yak-46 would have a planned service life of 60,000 hours, based on an annual average flying time of 3,000 hours. Yakovlev was constructing a wooden mockup of the Yak-46 as of November 1991. By August 1992, it was planning for co-production of the aircraft in South Africa.

As of March 1993, Yakovlev had received one order to develop the Yak-46, which temporarily saved the firm from bankruptcy. In mid-1994, the Progress engine design bureau was looking to create a turbojet derivative of its D-27 to use on the Yak-46. Later that year, it was reported that the Yak-46 would use two Progress D-727 high-bypass turbofan engines, without mention of a propfan aircraft version. In 1996, though, another airliner census still described a Yak-46-1 version with D-727 underwing engines followed by a Yak-46-2 with D-27 aft-mounted engines in a T-tail empennage configuration. Because of engine development issues, neither of the planes would fly before the year 2000.

Specifications

See also

 Antonov An-180
 Boeing 7J7
 McDonnell Douglas MD-94X
 MPC 75
 Tupolev Tu-334
 Yakovlev Yak-44

References

Citations

Bibliography

External links

 

Yak-046
Propfan-powered aircraft